Nirmal Chatterjee (5 February 1918 – 10 December 1977) was an Indian cricketer. He played 56 first-class matches for Bengal between 1937 and 1955.

See also
 List of Bengal cricketers

References

External links
 

1918 births
1977 deaths
Indian cricketers
Bengal cricketers
People from Nadia district